Nederbeat (also: Nederbiet) was the Dutch rock boom of mid-1960s influenced by British beat groups and rock bands such as the Beatles and the Rolling Stones and, much like British freakbeat, it is essentially the Dutch counterpart to American garage rock. Among the best-known Nederbeat groups are the Golden Earrings, The Motions, The Outsiders and Shocking Blue.

History

In the 1960s, The Beatles and the Merseybeat sound began to dominate the Dutch charts, which led to interest among Dutch musicians in forming bands that perform such music, replacing a previous genre Indorock performed by Indonesian immigrants. The interest was further spurred on by the Beatles concerts in the Netherlands in 1964 which drew large crowds, followed by a performance by The Rolling Stones at the Kurhaus in Scheveningen disrupted by an excited audience. The emergence of pirate station Radio Veronica also worked to stimulate the Dutch music community to produce a great amount of 'Nederbeat'.

The Hague was the country's beat capital, where bands such as the Golden Earrings (the predecessor of Golden Earring), InCrowd, Q65, Het, Sandy Coast and The Motions were formed, along with its neighbouring coastal town Scheveningen.  The clubs on its boulevard, from where Veronica's pirate ship was constantly visible, became the locus for Dutch talent. Other bands such as the Outsiders also emerged in Amsterdam. These bands generally performed in English, with the exception of a few such as Het who performed in Dutch.

The Motions were the first Nederbeat band to produce a charting single in the Netherlands with their song "It's gone". Their guitarist Robbie van Leeuwen would later form The Shocking Blue. Other popular groups were the Outsiders, Q65, Golden Earrings , Ro-d-ys, The Shoes, and Cuby & the Blizzards.

Nederbeat had association with the psychedelia and counterculture of the 1960s in the Netherlands. The beat sound was popular for a few years before the sound started to change, and the musical style of the bands evolved. Soul and rhythm and blues became more popular, groups that performed in such style include Rob Hoeke Rhythm & Blues Group. The Cats shifted into the palingsound they created, while Cuby & the Blizzards developed their own distinct style of blues.  

The bands were mostly popular only in the Netherlands, but a few bands found success internationally. In 1970, Tee-Set had a top 10 hit with "Ma Belle Amie" in many countries, while Shocking Blue did better with "Venus", which became the first ever No. 1 single by a Dutch band on Billboard Hot 100. Later in 1973, Golden Earring also had a worldwide hit with "Radar Love". Despite the successes, the genre however had faded by the 1970s as popular music moved on to other genres such as disco.

List of Nederbeat bands

The following is incomplete list of Nederbeat bands and some of their songs:
  – "Such A Cad", "I Know"
 
 
 The Cats – "What A Crazy Life", "Sure He's A Cat"
 Cuby & the Blizzards – "Window of My Eyes"
 Eddysons – "Ups and Downs"
 Golden Earrings – 
 Group 1850
   – "Ik Heb Geen Zin Om Op Te Staan"
 Jay-Jays – "Baldheaded Woman (No Sugar In My Coffee)"
  – "St. James Infirmary", "Jezebel" 
 The Motions – "Wasted Words", "Why Don't You Take It" 
 The Outsiders – "Touch", "Monkey On Your Back"
 The Phantoms (Dutch band) – "I'll Go Crazy", "Tormented"
 Q65 – "The Life I Live", "You're The Victor"
  – "Take Her Home", "Just Fancy"
 Sandy Coast  – "A Girl Like You", "I See Your Face Again"
 The Shoes –  "Na, Na, Na", "Standing And Staring"
 Shocking Blue –
 Tee-Set – "Don't You Leave", "Early In The Morning"
 Zen – "Hair"
  –

See also
List of garage rock bands
Nederpop

References

External links
 Nederbeat database

.
Pop music genres
Rock music genres
Dutch styles of music